The Gavarnie Falls (French: Grande Cascade de Gavarnie) is a tiered waterfall in France. With its overall drop of 422 metres, it is the highest waterfall in mainland France. The falls are situated in the Cirque de Gavarnie, near the village Gavarnie in the Hautes-Pyrénées.

The waterfall is the beginning of the Gave de Pau stream. It is fed by a melting snow and a small glacier, located in Spain. This water seeps underground until it appears at the upper rim of waterfall. The average annual flow in the waterfall is 3 m3/s. In summer, when the snowmelt is most intense, it can reach up to 200 m3/s. In winter it sometimes freezes and stops flowing.

The waterfall has 2 - 3 steps; the height of the tallest drop is 281 m.

References

External links

World Waterfall Database

Landforms of Hautes-Pyrénées
Pyrenees
Waterfalls of France
Tourist attractions in Hautes-Pyrénées
Tiered waterfalls